Assawt (in Arabic الصوت meaning The Voice in English), also known as Al Sawt was an Arabic-language newspaper based in Kuwait.

History
Assawt was established in 2008 and its first issue appeared on 21 October 2008. It became the fifteenth daily in the country. Youssef Al Someit, former information minister of Kuwait, headed the daily.

However, Assawt was disestablished in January 2009 due to economic reasons.

See also
List of newspapers in Kuwait

References

2008 establishments in Kuwait
2009 disestablishments in Kuwait
Arabic-language newspapers
Defunct newspapers published in Kuwait
Newspapers established in 2008
Publications disestablished in 2009